Nennius is a mythical prince of Britain at the time of Julius Caesar's invasions of Britain (55–54 BC). His story appears in Geoffrey of Monmouth's History of the Kings of Britain (1136), a work whose contents are now considered largely fictional. In Middle Welsh versions of Geoffrey's Historia he was called Nynniaw.

In Geoffrey's story, Nennius is said to have fought Caesar in personal combat and taken his sword, which he used to kill many Romans. In the Tudor and Jacobean eras he became an emblem of British patriotism.

Geoffrey's account
The History gives the following account of Nennius's life:  He was the third son of Heli and brother of Lud and Cassibelanus (and according to Welsh sources, of Llefelys). He fought alongside Cassibelanus when Caesar invaded. He and his nephew Androgeus led the troops of Trinovantum (London) and Canterbury, when they encountered Caesar's own troops and Nennius faced Caesar in single combat. Caesar struck Nennius a blow to the head, but his sword got stuck in Nennius's shield. After they separated in the melée, Nennius threw away his own sword and attacked the Romans with Caesar's sword, killing many, including the tribune Quintus Laberius Durus (whom Geoffrey erroneously names  Labienus, confusing him with Titus Labienus). According to Geoffrey, "everyone whom Nennius struck with the sword either had his head chopped off or else was so wounded as Nennius passed that he had no hope of ever recovering".

Fifteen days after the battle Nennius died of his head wound, and was buried at London (the "City of the Trinovantes"), near the North Gate. Caesar's sword, named Crocea Mors ("Yellow Death"), was buried with him.

Later versions
The Anglo-Norman writer Wace expands on the story of the fight in his book Roman de Brut, in which there is detailed description of the combat. Caesar defeats Nennius, but his sword is stuck in Nennius' shield, and he is forced to retreat when Nennius' friends come to his aid. In this version, the loss of his sword is a humiliation that leads to Caesar's withdrawal and inspires rebellion in France.

In the Tudor period Nennius became a patriotic symbol of British independence. In The Mirror for Magistrates he is portrayed as an "inspirational lesson for future British people to defend their country from foreign invasion". In this version Caesar only defeats him by cheating—he poisons his sword-tip. Nennius also appears in plays in the Jacobean era, notably Jasper Fisher's Fuimus Troes and John Fletcher's Bonduca. In the former he embodies the fighting spirit of the Britons and is given the patriotic opening speech exhorting the people to resist invasion. His funeral games after his fight with Caesar form the climactic point of the play. In the latter he is anachronistically portrayed as a contemporary of Boudica, acting as one of her generals.

References

External links
Geoffrey of Monmouth, Historia Regum Britanniae 3.20, 4.3-4

Traditional history of Julius Caesar's invasions of Britain
Legendary English people